Seoul Broadcasting High School is a specialised public high school located in Oksu-dong, Seongdong-gu, Seoul.

History
Seoul Broadcasting High School was founded on October 30, 1991 under the name Dongho Technical High School (동호공업고등학교). The school changed its name to Dongho Information Technical High School (동호정보공업고등학교) in 2001 before changing it to its current Seoul Broadcasting High School on February 29, 2008. Current principal Yang Han-seok was appointed on March 1, 2013 as the school's 9th principal. As of 4 February 2015, there are a total of 7,177 graduates.

Departments
 Broadcasting Video (방송영상과)
 Broadcasting System (방송시스템과)
 Media Contents (미디어콘텐츠과)
 Broadcasting Entertainment (방송연예공과)

Notable alumni

2017
 Dino (SEVENTEEN)

2016
 Min-gyu (SEVENTEEN)
 Seungkwan (SEVENTEEN)
 Kang Min-ah, actress

2014
 Baekho (NU'EST)
 JR (NU'EST)

2013
Kaeun (After School)

References

External links
 

High schools in Seoul
Seongdong District
Educational institutions established in 1991
1991 establishments in South Korea